The Battle of Sevan was a turning point in the history of a seven-year war.  After the battle, Armenian troops under the command of Ashot cleared the central and northern region of the country from foreign invaders.

Background 
In the year 921, the armies of Yusuf Beshir entered Armenia, hoping to take advantage of the temporary conflicts of the Armenian king and his subjects, near Lake Sevan. He then besieged Ashot II. Hoping to overwhelm them by the superiority of their forces, Beshir had started arrangements for the surrender of the Armenians. The Armenians made a formal agreement, but by the next day in the morning, Ashot II had formed 70 of their best archers and headed towards Beshir's camps, with seven archers for each boat. Enemy soldiers, assuming a quick victory, had gathered around on the shore and the Armenian archers released a heavy barrage into the enemy forces. The Arab army took to flight, and were defeated.

Siege 
Yusuf, who had received information that Ashot had retired on the island of Sevan, then sent Nusir, a chief to capture Ashot the king. Nusir made it to Duin, where he captured several people.  Later Nusir was succeeded by Beshir, a chief who took his place. Beshir then sent 1,000 of his men to attack the island and capture the king. Beshir was met by George the Marzbedunian. With his small army, they attacked Beshir's army, and killed the enemy in great numbers, which had caused them to flee. Beshir did not expect this defeat. He then gathered more troops and went after George the Marzbedunian. He failed to capture him. Beshir approached Lake Sevan.  Ashot prepared ten boats, where he placed archers with great skills with the bow. It was said  for each arrow was shot with such precision that it never missed killing or wounding its target. Beshir's army ultimately fled in defeat.

References 

Sevan
Sevan
10th century in Armenia
Sevan
921